Thabiso Paul Moqhali (born 7 December 1967) is a retired male marathon runner from Lesotho. He won the gold medal at the 1998 Commonwealth Games held in Kuala Lumpur in a time of 2:19:15 hours, the slowest winning time since 1966. In addition he finished 16th at the 2000 Summer Olympics.

Achievements
All results regarding marathon, unless stated otherwise

External links

 sports-reference

1967 births
Living people
Lesotho male long-distance runners
Athletes (track and field) at the 1992 Summer Olympics
Athletes (track and field) at the 2000 Summer Olympics
Olympic athletes of Lesotho
Athletes (track and field) at the 1986 Commonwealth Games
Athletes (track and field) at the 1990 Commonwealth Games
Athletes (track and field) at the 1994 Commonwealth Games
Athletes (track and field) at the 1998 Commonwealth Games
Athletes (track and field) at the 2002 Commonwealth Games
Commonwealth Games gold medallists for Lesotho
Commonwealth Games medallists in athletics
World Athletics Championships athletes for Lesotho
Lesotho male marathon runners
Medallists at the 1998 Commonwealth Games